Rafael Nicanor Guarderas Saravia (born 12 September 1993) is a Peruvian professional footballer who plays for Liga 1 club Cantolao. He is usually deployed as a deep-lying playmaker.

Club career
Guarderas moved up to the Universitario de Deportes first team in January 2012. He made his Torneo Descentralizado league debut in an away match against Inti Gas Deportes. He played the entire match but could not help Universitario avoid the 0–1 defeat.

Guarderas re-joined UTC for the 2019 season. Already in June 2019, he left the club to return to Universitario.

On 13 December 2022, it was announced that Guarderes would join Cantolao on 1 January 2023.

Honours
Universitario
 Torneo Descentralizado: 2013

References

External links

1993 births
Living people
Footballers from Lima
Peruvian footballers
Club Universitario de Deportes footballers
Peruvian Primera División players
Association football midfielders
Footballers at the 2015 Pan American Games
Pan American Games competitors for Peru
Deportivo Municipal footballers
Alianza Atlético footballers
Academia Deportiva Cantolao players